Cut is a 2000 Australian slasher film directed by Kimble Rendall and starring Kylie Minogue, Molly Ringwald, Jessica Napier, and Tiriel Mora.

Plot
Fed up with Brad's (Frank Roberts) on-screen foul-ups, his director, Hilary Jacobs (Kylie Minogue), publicly humiliates him and fires him on the spot in front of onlookers. As he comes hoping for one more chance, she further degrades him in her office, which causes the actor to go berserk, mutilating himself then cutting out her tongue using the modified prop shears as his real-life signature weapon. Before he can harm anyone else, his co-star Vanessa Turnbill (Molly Ringwald) gives him a makeshift tracheotomy which ends in Brad being seemingly electrocuted as P.A. man Lossman (Geoff Revell) looks on. But as Brad dies, he curses the perceived source of his misery: the movie Hot Blooded! and all who would work on it.

In present-day Australia, Lossman is a teacher using his personal experiences as warnings to his students that any attempts to complete filming or even screening of Hot Blooded! has ended up with lives lost in mysterious and disturbing ways (like a producer being suspiciously electrocuted in an editing room or a director mysteriously discovered with his throat slit). But some of his pupils, seeing the chance as too much of a temptation, decide to finish the film as a graduation grade. They contact Vanessa Turnbill to co-star. When she arrives at the airport she is greeted by Raffy and Hester who take her to a press conference to give the film publicity. Interviewing her, a reporter asks Vanessa if she is worried about the curse on the film. She passes off the question with a joke, saying "Oh if I die, I get paid extra".

As the crew makes the movie, the Scarman kills most of them, one by one, attacking when they are alone and then hiding the bodies. He also kills two police officers who were investigating the strange events, and the caretaker of the house where the crew was filming. Raffy, Vanessa and Lossman are the last ones alive. Lossman realizes that the Scarman is a supernatural monster and they have to destroy the work print to defeat him. Raffy manages to burn the reels in a fire, and the Scarman is eradicated.

In New York, another copy of the movie Hot Blooded! is found and a college teacher decides to show it to her students. As the projection of the film starts, the Scarman comes out of the print.

Cast

Production
The film was shot in South Australia in the Adelaide region.

Reception
Cut received negative reviews from critics and audiences, earning an 11% approval rating on Rotten Tomatoes based on 9 critic reviews.

Box office
Cut grossed $501,979 at the box office in Australia.

References

External links

Cut on Rotten Tomatoes
Cut at Oz Movies

2000 films
2000s slasher films
Films shot in Adelaide
2000 comedy horror films
Australian slasher films
Australian horror films
Trimark Pictures films
Australian comedy horror films
2000s English-language films